Tunica may refer to:

 The Latin word for tunic, a type of clothing typical in the ancient world

Biology
 Tunica (biology), a layer, sheath or similar covering
 "Tunica", an anatomical term for a membranous structure lining a cavity, or covering an organ such as a gland or a blood vessel
 Tunica albuginea (disambiguation), three different layers of connective tissue
 Tunica vasculosa (disambiguation), two different vascular layers
 Tunica externa, outermost tunica (layer) of a blood vessel, surrounding the tunica media
 Tunica intima, for short, is the innermost tunica (layer) of an artery or vein

Other
 Tunica, a flowering plant genus now included in Petrorhagia
 Tunica people, a Native American group in the central Mississippi River Valley
 Tunica language, an isolate of the associated Tunica historic peoples in the central Mississippi River Valley
 Tunica-Biloxi, a federally recognized tribe Native American tribe in Louisiana 
 Tunica, Louisiana
 Tunica, Mississippi
 Tunica County, Mississippi
 Tunica Lake, Lee County, Arkansas and Tunica County, Mississippi
 Tunica Academy, a non-denominational Christian private school
 Tunica Resorts, Mississippi

See also 
 

Language and nationality disambiguation pages